Bouresse is a commune in the Vienne department in the Nouvelle-Aquitaine region in western France. It has a population of 584 (2017).

See also
Communes of the Vienne department

References

Communes of Vienne